School of Courage is a 1954 Soviet war/adventure film directed by Vladimir Basov and Mstislav Korchagin. It is based on the 1929 novel School by Arkady Gaidar. Meant for juvenile audience, it became a 1954 Soviet box office leaders (10th place with 27.2 million viewers). The movie was a directorial debut for Vladimir Basov and Mstislav Korchagin (who died in a plane crash right after the end of shooting) and an acting debut for Rolan Bykov and Leonid Kharitonov.

Plot 
The film tells about a Russian high school student, Boris Golikov, during the First World War. He has been influenced by the official Czarist patriotism of the period, and is consequently horrified when he learns that his father has deserted from the front. But the arrest and execution of his father, and then the influence of his father's comrade, who has joined the Bolshevik force, leads him to join the Red Army on the Don front. He enters the detachment of the former teacher Semion Galka. With the detachment, he goes through the rear lines of the White forces to join up with the main Red Army.

Cast
 Leonid Kharitonov as Boris
 Mark Bernes as Afansii Chubuk
 Vladimir Yemelyanov as Guerilla Leadr
 Nikolai Garin as Colonel Zhikharev
 Georgi Gumilevsky as Akim Ryabukha
 Vadim Zakharchenko as Syrtsov
 Mikhail Pugovkin as Shmakov
 Nikolay Grabbe as Jan, aka Ivan, guerilla
 Vladimir Gorelov as Gypsy
 Roza Makagonova as Verka, peasant girl
 Evgeniya Melnikova as Mother Gorikova
 Pyotr Chernov as Father Gorikov
 Grigory Mikhaylov as Verka's Father
 Rolan Bykov as student of a real school

Awards 
 1954 — Best educational film at the 8th Karlovy Vary International Film Festival

References

External links 
 

1954 films
Soviet war adventure films
1950s Russian-language films
1950s war adventure films
Mosfilm films
Films based on Russian novels
Films directed by Vladimir Basov
Russian World War I films